Anthia thoracica, the two-spotted ground beetle, is a species of beetles of the family Carabidae.

Description
Body is black, with an ovate patch of yellowish setae on each lateral extension of the pronotum and a band of whitish reclinate setae on the lateral margins of elytra. Mandibles are strong and elongate in males. Pronotum has broad lateral flanges and elytra are ovate and smooth, with eight linear striae.

Distribution
This species can be found in Namibia, Tanzania and South Africa.

References
 Biolib
 Mawdsley, J; Erwin, T; Sithole, H; Mawdsley, J; Mawdsley, A; 2011   The genus Anthia Weber in the Republic of South Africa, Identification, distribution, biogeography, and behavior (Coleoptera, Carabidae) 
 Bug Nation

External links

Anthiinae (beetle)
Beetles described in 1784